"Soap" is a song by Melanie Martinez, featured on her debut studio album, Cry Baby. The song was released July 9, 2015, along with a music video the same day. It was released as the second single of her album Cry Baby, being set to impact Alternative radio outlets according to Warner Music. The song was featured in the 2016 film Nerve.

Background and composition
"Soap" was premiered exclusively on Elle magazine's website on July 9, 2015. The alt-pop and electropop track was released as the second single from Martinez's debut album, Cry Baby.

In the interview with Elle, Martinez described the song, "Soap was written about my current boyfriend when we were first talking, I felt too scared to say how I felt about him and thought if I told him it'd be like throwing a toaster in his bath. So I washed my mouth out with soap. I think anyone can really relate to this song. I'm sure there was a time in everyone's life where they felt too scared to say how they felt so they 'washed their mouth out with soap'". She continued, "Everyone is allowed to be vulnerable. I think women and men and dogs and cats and ants and aliens can all express themselves and be vulnerable".

Music video
The music video for "Soap" was released July 10, 2015, the same day the audio was released. It was directed by a couple of Martinez's friends in her hotel room tub.

The song and video were reviewed by Toronto Paradise, who gave a long, praising, positive review saying, "Unlike some artists that can come across as rather fake, and too try hard following hipster trends of "budget" style videos and “Bedroom Demo” style tracks, there isn't many who get it right in the end. Those that do will win hard in the long run! Melanie Martinez is absolutely intriguing from her looks to her lyrical delivery and almost theatrical performances. Fans are loving her self conflicted mind and her interpretation of daily problems. She's relatable, speaks from a real place and speaks to the current generation of music fans. Even Elle Magazine can't get enough of her! Melanie's vocals on Soap showcase her breathy and spacey intergalactic tone, resembling a darker Ellie Goulding and Lights, while the production remains complex with its beautiful and cloudy melodies".

Another music video for "Soap" was released November 18, 2015 as a double feature music video with her song "Training Wheels" and in mid-2017, Martinez's promotional "Soap" music video was made unlisted and only can be accessible by the original link. In some scenes, clips from the promotional video can be seen playing on a TV.

Track listing

Personnel
Production
 Mixing – Mitch McCarthy 
 Mastering – Chris Gehringer

Charts

Certifications

Release history

Notes

References

External links

2015 singles
2015 songs
Melanie Martinez songs
Atlantic Records singles
Songs written by Melanie Martinez
Songs written by Emily Warren
Songs about heartache